Hibbertia fasciculata is a species of flowering plant in the family Dilleniaceae and is endemic to south-eastern Australia. It is a small erect to spreading shrub with glabrous stems except on new growth, narrow linear leaves, and yellow flowers arranged in leaf axils, with eight to twelve stamens surrounding three carpels.

Description
Flowering occurs from September to December.

Taxonomy
Hibbertia fasciculata was first formally described in 1817 by Augustin Pyramus de Candolle in his Regni Vegetabilis Systema Naturale from an unpublished description by Robert Brown. The specific epithet (fasciculata) means "crowded".

In Victoria, this species is known as H. fasciculata var. prostrata, although the plant is rarely prostrate in that state. In South Australia and Tasmania, it is known as Hibbertia prostrata.

Distribution and habitat
This hibbertia grows in heath and forest in Queensland, coastal areas of New South Wales, south-eastern South Australia and Tasmania. It is widely distributed in Victoria where it is known as Hibbertia fasciculata var. prostrata.

Conservation status
Hibbertia fasciculata is listed as of "least concern" under the Queensland Government Nature Conservation Act 1992.

References

fasciculata
Flora of New South Wales
Flora of Queensland
Flora of Victoria (Australia)
Flora of Tasmania
Flora of South Australia
Plants described in 1817
Taxa named by Augustin Pyramus de Candolle